Sur-papakh is an Azerbaijani sport played on horseback.

Rules 
The game is divided into two ten-minute halves. The object of the game is to pass a papakha (sheepskin hat) between the riders until the hat can be thrown through a ring-shaped goal similar to a basketball hoop. The opposing team attempts to intercept the hat (but may not physically contact opposing riders) to prevent the goal from being scored.

Variations 
Several variations of the game exist:
 A children's game, in which the hat is replaced with a ball, and the children run on the field rather than riding on horseback.
 A version played on horseback in which the goal of the game is to steal the opposing team's hats.

References 

Azerbaijani culture
Equestrian team sports